William Charles Schuster (August 4, 1912 – June 28, 1987) was a professional baseball player who played shortstop in the Major Leagues from 1937 to 1945. He would play for the Pittsburgh Pirates, Boston Bees, and Chicago Cubs.

Schuester attended Seneca Vocational High School before signing a professional contract in 1934. 

Schuster scored the winning run in the Chicago Cubs' last victory in a World Series game, prior to 2016. He was a pinch-runner in the 11th inning of Game 6 at Wrigley Field in the 1945 World Series and scored from first base on Stan Hack's walk-off double for an 8-7 Cub win over Detroit. It turned out to be Schuster's last appearance in a Major League game.

After retiring as a player, Schuster managed the Vancouver Capilanos of the Western International League in 1950 and 1951, served as a third base coach for the Seattle Rainiers, worked in the press room of the Los Angeles Times and worked at a gas station in Woodland Hills, California before dying of a heart attack at age 74.

For his long career in the minor leagues, which included 2,168 hits over 16 seasons, Schuster is a member of the Pacific Coast League Hall of Fame.

References

External links

1912 births
1987 deaths
Major League Baseball shortstops
Pittsburgh Pirates players
Boston Bees players
Chicago Cubs players
Baseball players from Buffalo, New York
Buffalo Bulls baseball players
Albany Senators players
Hollywood Stars players
Los Angeles Angels (minor league) players
Montreal Royals players
Sacramento Solons players
Scranton Miners players
Seattle Rainiers players
Toronto Maple Leafs (International League) players
Vancouver Mounties players
American expatriate baseball players in Canada